Vietnamese Fishermen's Association v. Knights of the Ku Klux Klan was a successful lawsuit brought by Vietnamese Americans in 1981 against a faction of the Ku Klux Klan.

Background
After the Vietnam War, conflict arose on the Texas Gulf Coast between white fishermen and newly arrived Vietnamese shrimpers. On February 14, 1981, the Ku Klux Klan hosted a fish fry on a private farm in Santa Fe, to protest the growing presence of Vietnamese shrimpers. During the event, a Vietnamese fishing boat was ceremonially burned. There were similar conflicts in nearby port towns like Rockport, and an offshore "boat ride" by Klan members on March 15 the same year, which frightened families of Vietnamese fishermen.

Legal action
On April 16, 1981, Morris Dees of the Southern Poverty Law Center filed a lawsuit against the Klan on behalf a group of Vietnamese American fishermen. The trial of Vietnamese Fishermen's Association v. Knights of the Ku Klux Klan began on May 10 before Judge Gabrielle Kirk McDonald in the United States District Court for the Southern District of Texas, Houston Division; on May 14, the judge issued a preliminary injunction forbidding the defendants from harassing the Vietnamese fishermen or inciting harassment of them, and in a July written opinion, entirely upheld the lawsuit on the basis of Texas law and the Sherman Antitrust Act. In a March 1982 hearing, McDonald considered whether the Klan's military activities contravened Texas law against private armies; she determined that they did, rejecting the Klan's claim of a Second Amendment exemption, and on June 9, 1982, a permanent injunction was issued ordering the Texas Emergency Reserve to disband.

See also
Alamo Bay, 1985 film about the conflict

References

1981 in Texas
Legal cases
Vietnamese migration